Hidden Agenda is a 2017 action-adventure game developed by Supermassive Games and published by Sony Interactive Entertainment. It was released on 24 October 2017 for PlayStation 4.

Gameplay
Hidden Agenda is a psychological action-adventure game played from a third-person perspective. The player takes control of homicide detective Becky Marney (Katie Cassidy) and district attorney Felicity Graves (Christy Choi/Ashley Voom), both of whom are involved in the case of a serial killer known as The Trapper. The game features quick time events that determine the outcome of the story, including a character's death or survival. With the PlayLink feature, others may join the game to vote for a specific decision to be made, using their Android or iOS smartphones. In competitive mode, one player will at some point receive a secret objective, or Hidden Agenda, which is intended to create conflict between the players as they try to prevent it from happening.

Plot

Part 1
The game opens on an event that occurs six weeks before the playable prologue; Father Rominski is seen sitting in a prayer position with a bomb attached to him. When police officers enter the room, another bomb detonates, killing everyone.

In November 2012, Third Precinct detective Becky Marney and her partner Tom Nelson (Leonard Roberts/Michael Addo) arrive at the scene of a possible hostage situation by a serial killer known as the Trapper. Becky can choose to either be cautious and scope the place out or be confident and go straight through the front door. Depending on choices, Tom and/or the hostage Daniella Cardenas (Catherine Toribio/Eleni Miariti) can be killed. Either way, suspected perpetrator Jonathan Finn (Yan Feldman/Jonathan Burteaux) is captured and arrested. Finn confesses to the Trapper crimes and is sentenced to death by lethal injection by Judge William Vanstone (Robert Lewis Merrill/Simon Bond) upon the recommendation of district attorney Felicity Graves. If Tom died or was promoted to sergeant, Becky is assigned a new partner, Karl Carter (West Liang/Jozef Aoki). 

In 2017, Sergeant Noah Riggs (Chris L. McKenna/Jack Green) is briefing Becky, her partner, and detective Jack Calvary (Chad Michael Collins/Dawid Kocieda) on more unsolved murder victims. Calvary antagonizes Becky, and the meeting is dismissed.

As Finn's execution date is approaching, his lawyer contacts Felicity to tell her that Finn wants to make a confession. Finn claims to Felicity that he falsely confessed to being the Trapper, and that the real killer is Adam Jones, his old friend from Las Palmas Orphanage. Finn claims Jones' motive for the killings was fueled by Rominski's physical abuse of him when he was a child, adding that Rominski had regularly abused children at the orphanage. Finn claims he was double-crossed by Jones, who promised him he would be freed after his false confessions. Finn offers to draw a map and can overpower Felicity if she lets her guard down.

After Felicity presents the lead on Jones to the Third Precinct, it is discovered that the orphanage housed a child with Jones' name, but he supposedly died in the fire that shut down the orphanage. She is told by medical examiner Simon Hillary (Gabriel Schwalenstocker/Leonardo Patane) that there was no reason to suspect another killer besides Finn. Becky recounts an incident where she attended to a break-in in progress at a trailer park, where she found social worker Catherine Hope (Catherine Haena Kim/Zara Sparkes) tied up and gagged with a bomb strapped to her. Depending on actions, Becky either finds all the clues and saves Hope or escapes while Hope is killed in the explosion. It is later revealed that Hope worked at the orphanage and that the children reported Rominski's abuse of them to her, but she did nothing to stop it. Finn had supposedly left a hair at the scene of Hope's capture. Hillary reports that he ran the DNA through their database and Finn came up as the match.

Becky and Felicity can develop a personal relationship or keep it professional. This results in Felicity looking into the Trapper victims with Becky or by herself. They note the victims were all connected to the Las Palmas Orphanage: alcoholic undertaker Rupert Walsh, orderly Frederick LeMay, social worker Catherine Hope, and Father Rominski. She notices photos of mouse traps in the files, which she can be informed by Riggs is a signature of the Trapper.

Calvary is later killed alongside a first responding officer in a bombing with the same M.O. as the Trapper. Surveillance footage shows Calvary meeting with a prostitute before his demise. The officers start to suspect Becky of being the real Trapper due to her feud with Calvary. Hillary examines Calvary's body but doesn't permit Becky to have a closer look, and another explosion almost kills them all. Becky can choose to provide an alibi for the night of Calvary's murder; not providing one causes suspicion of her to increase.

Part 2
Riggs debriefs the officers on Calvary's murder, saying they are treating it as a Trapper copycat. He also formally introduces Felicity, saying she is familiar with the Trapper and is here to assist the investigation. Felicity has the choice to request for Vanstone to grant Finn a temporary release, but Becky can persuade her not to proceed, believing Finn to be dangerous and untrustworthy. If Finn is temporarily released, he will be present when investigating Jones' childhood home with Becky and Felicity.

Becky attempts to interview sanitation worker Vernon LeMay (Larry Fessenden), the brother of Frederick. Vernon flees upon encountering Becky. If she keeps up with him during the chase and calms him down, he reveals that Frederick was an orderly at the orphanage and sold drugs to the Third Precinct, which caused the precinct to cover up the reports of abuse at the orphanage. Otherwise, Vernon doesn't reveal anything and jumps to his death. Becky then visits the house of Jody Johnson (Deonna Bouye/Storm Stewart), who is Walsh's widow. Johnson states that Walsh was an abusive alcoholic, and criticizes the police for not helping her when she reported that he was abusing her. Becky also investigates the remains of the orphanage, where she encounters a hooded suspect. She chases the figure, and may catch a glimpse of his face if she keeps up. Regardless, the figure escapes. 

Becky revisits the scene of Calvary's murder, where she encounters the hooded figure again. She then calls her partner, saying they need to meet and talk. As the act ends, a feminine figure is seen sewing something into an unseen gagged victim.

Part 3
If Cardenas survived the prologue, she can be brought to the police station, where she reveals that Jones became a "police doctor." This causes Becky's partner to realize that Jones is Hillary. Jones stole the identity of the real Hillary and covered his tracks while employed as the medical examiner. It can also be discovered that Jones was orphaned because his mother shot his father to death after suffering repeated physical abuse. Judge Vanstone later sentenced Jones' mother to life imprisonment without the possibility of parole and barred her from seeing Jones. Jones' mother subsequently committed suicide in prison, fueling Jones' disdain for Vanstone even more. It can also be found that Jones worked odd jobs for Walsh, and noticed that Walsh repeatedly beat his wife and hired prostitutes. Becky meets with her partner at a restaurant, and can tell him she returned to the scene of Calvary's murder or that Hillary is Jones, but her partner dismisses her and leaves.

There are a number of endings:
Becky consumes a drugged drink at the restaurant and awakens in a rundown house next to Vanstone, who has a bomb planted in his stomach. She can either save Vanstone, be killed alongside him in the explosion, shoot him dead and survive, or flee and leave him to die. In the latter two cases, she is framed as the Trapper and is confronted by her partner outside, who shoot her dead.
Becky is attacked in her car by a waitress. If Becky succeeds in fending her off, the waitress escapes in a car with Becky in hot pursuit. She finds that the license plate of the waitress’ car is registered to "Simon Hillary", revealing that she was Jones dressed as a woman. She calls her partner for backup and follows Jones into his house, which he attempts to burn down to dispose of the evidence. They fight, and Jones holds Becky's partner at gunpoint. The results of the conflict depend on the player's completion of QTEs. If the QTEs are successful, Becky shoots Jones and arrests him with her partner.
Becky and Felicity work together and track down Jones to his house, which they find him attempting to burn down. Finn also appears if he was granted temporary release. Jones attacks them, and Finn's alignment depends on the player's treatment of him. The results of the fight depend on the player's completion of QTEs.

If Becky was framed as the Trapper, a post-credits scene shows Hillary buying more mouse traps.

Development
Supermassive Games served as the game's developer, using Unreal Engine 4.

Release
Hidden Agenda was announced at E3 2017, along with a launch trailer promoting support for the PlayLink feature.

Reception 
Hidden Agenda received "mixed or average" reviews according to review aggregator Metacritic.

Awards
The game won the award for "Best of E3" at the GamesRadar+ E3 Awards.

Notes

References

Action-adventure games
Interactive movie video games
Multiplayer video games
Multiplayer and single-player video games
PlayStation 4 games
PlayStation 4-only games
Single-player video games
Sony Interactive Entertainment games
Survival video games
Video games about police officers
Video games developed in the United Kingdom
Video games featuring female protagonists
Video games set in the United States
Video games scored by Alastair Lindsay
Video games with alternate endings
Supermassive Games
2017 video games
Unreal Engine games
Psychological thriller video games